Josef Beneš (11 January 1902 in Prachatice – 17 December 1984 in Prague) was a Czech linguist, specialising in anthroponymy and onomastics.

Beneš studied Bohemistics and Germanistics at the Charles University in Prague, ending in 1930. Later, he worked on several places as a teacher in schools providing secondary education. After World War II he briefly worked at the Ministry of Education, then returned to the teaching. From the beginning of the 1960s he lectured at pedagogic institutes in Liberec and Ústí nad Labem.

Since 1933 he published articles about Czech surnames in specialised journals (as Naše řeč or Zpravodaj místopisné komise ČSAV, ZMK). In 1962 he published book  "About Czech Surnames". His daughter, Dobrava Moldanová, collected many of his articles into book "Our Surnames" (1983). Posthumously "German Surnames of Czechs" was published in 1998, with Marie Nováková as an editor.

Beneš belongs, together with Vladimír Šmilauer, Jan Svoboda and Antonín Profous, among founders of Czech anthroponymy and onomastics.

Selected works
 "O českých příjmeních" (About Czech Surnames), Prague, 1962 and 1970
 "Naše příjmení" (Our Surnames), edited by Dobrava Moldanová, 1983, Mladá fronta, Prague. Reprint in 2004, .
 "Německá příjmení u Čechů" (German Surnames of Czechs), by University of J.E. Purkyně, Ústí nad Labem, 1998,

External links
 Detailed bibliography of Josef Beneš 

1902 births
1984 deaths
Czech academics
Linguists from the Czech Republic
Charles University alumni
20th-century linguists